Kacper Stokowski (born 6 January 1999) is a Polish competitive swimmer who won two gold medals in the 200-metre freestyle and the 4×200-metre freestyle relay at the 2016 European Junior Swimming Championships. He is the former junior world record holder in the 50- and 100 metre backstroke (short course).

References

1999 births
Living people
Polish male freestyle swimmers
Polish male backstroke swimmers
Swimmers from Warsaw
Swimmers at the 2020 Summer Olympics
Olympic swimmers of Poland
Medalists at the FINA World Swimming Championships (25 m)
Florida Gators men's swimmers
21st-century Polish people